The 1999–2000 Algerian Cup was the 35th edition of the Algerian Cup. CR Beni Thour won the Cup by defeating WA Tlemcen 2-1. It was CR Beni Thour's first Algerian Cup in its history.

Round of 64

Round of 32

Round of 16

Quarter-finals

Semi-finals

Final

Champions

External links
 1999/00 Coupe Nationale

Algerian Cup
Algerian Cup